Al-Kabir mosque means "the great mosque", or perhaps "the main mosque".  It may refer to:
Atiq Mosque, Awjila, a mosque in the oasis village of Awjila in the Sahara desert of the Cyrenaica region of eastern Libya
Great Mosque of Aleppo, the largest and one of the oldest mosques in the city of Aleppo, Syria
Great Mosque of Gaza, the largest and oldest mosque in the Gaza Strip, located in Gaza's old city
Great Mosque of Sana'a, an ancient mosque in Sana'a, Yemen
Umayyad Mosque, also known as the Great Mosque of Damascus